Madao (Mandarin: 马道街道) is a town in Xichang, Liangshan Yi Autonomous Prefecture, Sichuan, China. In 2010, Madao Subdistrict had a total population of 19,427: 10,068 males and 9,359 females: 2,853 aged under 14, 14,343 aged between 15 and 65 and 2,231 aged over 65.

References 
 

Township-level divisions of Sichuan
Xichang